Mary Cal Hollis is an American activist. She was a third-party candidate for President of the United States in the 1996 U.S. presidential election, representing the Socialist Party USA (SPUSA) with running mate Eric Chester.  Hollis and Chester also received the endorsement and ballot line of Vermont's Liberty Union Party, receiving 674 votes (80.1%) in their primary.  Hollis appeared on the syndicated radio program Democracy Now! with two other socialist presidential candidates for a discussion and debate.  The SPUSA ticket received 4,765 votes in the general election.

She returned in 2000 as the vice-presidential candidate of the SPUSA, running with David McReynolds and receiving 5,602 votes.

Hollis lives in Colorado. She is a native of Pine Bluff, Arkansas.

References

External links

Encyclopedia of Arkansas History & Culture entry

Female candidates for President of the United States
Socialist Party USA presidential nominees
Candidates in the 1996 United States presidential election
2000 United States vice-presidential candidates
20th-century American politicians
Year of birth missing (living people)
Living people
Liberty Union Party politicians
Socialist Party USA vice presidential nominees
Female candidates for Vice President of the United States
Politicians from Pine Bluff, Arkansas
20th-century American women politicians
21st-century American women